"Don't Throw It All Away" is a song written by British musician Gary Benson and first released by the Shadows on their 1975 album Specs Appeal. Benson released his version as a single later the same year, which reached number 20 on the UK Singles Chart in the fall of 1975.

Charts

Lori Balmer version
Australian pop singer Lori Balmer covered the song in 1976, reaching No. 66 in Australia.

Charts

Dave & Sugar version

A country version by Dave & Sugar on their That's the Way Love Should Be LP, released in 1977, was the first of two American charting versions. Co-produced by Charley Pride, the song became the group's third U.S. top 10 hit, reaching number five on both the American and Canadian Country charts.  It was also a top 40 hit on the Easy Listening charts of both nations.

Charts

Stacy Lattisaw version

Stacy Lattisaw covered "Don't Throw It All Away" in 1982. It was the first of three charting singles from her Sneakin' Out LP.  The song peaked at number 101 on the Billboard Pop chart and reached the top 10 on the R&B chart.

Charts

Other versions
 Olivia Newton-John recorded "Don't Throw It All Away" on her 1976 LP Come On Over.
 Barry Manilow recorded "Don't Throw It All Away" on his 1976 LP This One's for You.
 "Don't Throw It All Away" was recorded by Helen Reddy during her 1981 MCA sessions produced by Joel Diamond.

References

External links
 Lyrics of this song
 
 
 

1975 songs
1975 singles
1976 singles
1977 singles
1982 singles
Gary Benson (musician) songs
The Shadows songs
Dave & Sugar songs
Stacy Lattisaw songs
Songs written by Gary Benson (musician)
RCA Records singles
Cotillion Records singles